is a train station in the city of Ena, Gifu Prefecture, Japan, operated by the Third-sector railway operator Akechi Railway.

Lines

Station layout
Yamaoka Station has one side platform serving a single bi-directional track. The station is staffed.

Adjacent stations

|-
!colspan=5|Akechi Railway

History
It was renamed to its present name on December 20, 1956.

Surrounding area

See also
 List of Railway Stations in Japan

External links

 

Railway stations in Japan opened in 1934
Railway stations in Gifu Prefecture
Stations of Akechi Railway
Ena, Gifu